OneWeb Network Access Associates Limited is a communications company that aims to build broadband satellite Internet services. The company is headquartered in London, and has offices in Virginia, US and a satellite manufacturing facility in FloridaAirbus OneWeb Satellitesthat is a joint venture with Airbus Defence and Space. The company was formerly known as WorldVu Satellites Ltd.

The company was founded by Greg Wyler in 2012 and launched its first satellites in February 2019. It entered bankruptcy in March 2020 after failing to raise the required capital to complete the build and deployment of the remaining 90% of the network. The company emerged from the bankruptcy proceedings and reorganization in November 2020 with a new ownership group. As of 2021, Indian multinational company Bharti Global, France-based satellite service provider Eutelsat and the Government of the United Kingdom were the company's largest shareholders, while Japan's SoftBank retained an equity holding of 12%.

History 

The company was founded in 2012 under the name WorldVu, and was based in Britain's Channel Islands.

Google participation and transfer of the spectrum 
Early reports of the potential involvement of Google in offering broadband internet services surfaced in February 2014, when a "very large  [satellite] constellation" was rumored to be in the plans with as many as 1600 satellites. In May 2014, the early concept had been to have at least 20 satellites operating in each of 20 orbital planes to provide consistent internet coverage over the surface of the Earth.

By June 2014, WorldVu (later to be renamed to OneWeb) had acquired the satellite spectrum that was formerly owned by SkyBridge, a company that went bankrupt in 2000, in a much earlier attempt to offer broadband Internet services via satellite.

By September 2014, the WorldVu company had 30 employees, and several Google employees who had joined Google as part of the acquisition of O3b Networks in 2013 — Greg Wyler, Brian Holz and David Bettinger — left Google to become a part of WorldVu Satellites Ltd. They took with them the rights to a certain radio frequency spectrum that could be used to provide Internet access. At the time, WorldVu was working closely with SpaceX and SpaceX's founder Elon Musk to explore satellite internet services, although no formal relationship had been established and no launch commitments had been made in 2014.

SpaceX, initial manufacturing plans 
By November 2014, The Wall Street Journal reported that Musk and Wyler were considering options for building a factory to manufacture high-volume low-cost satellites, and that "initial talks had been held with state officials in Florida and Colorado" about potentially locating a factory in those states, as well as that SpaceX would likely launch the satellites. Also in November 2014, WorldVu issued a tender "to satellite manufacturers for 640 125-kg satellites", asking for responses by mid-December 2014, having secured regulatory approval for use of the requisite electromagnetic spectrum communication frequencies in mid-2014.

The 2014 OneWeb solicitation to satellite manufacturers was for a total build of approximately 900 small Internet-delivery satellites, including ground and on-orbit spares. Responses were received from both European and American manufacturers including Airbus Defence and Space, Lockheed Martin Space Systems, OHB SE, SSL and Thales Alenia Space, and discussions focused on how each of these companies might "escape their status-quo histories as major space hardware contractors and remake themselves into producers capable of producing multiple satellites per month, each with a cost of fewer than US$500,000". OneWeb announced that it planned to form a joint venture with the winning bidder and open a new facility for manufacturing the new smallsats.

Funding from Virgin Group and Qualcomm 
In January 2015, The Wall Street Journal reported that WorldVu, now operating under the name OneWeb Ltd, had secured funding from Virgin Group and Qualcomm to build and launch the constellation. OneWeb also divulged that the planned satellites would weigh approximately 125 kg and that the plans were to deploy approximately 650 of them in low Earth orbit to operate at  altitude. Just a few days later, Elon Musk announced the rival Starlink venture, with the opening of the SpaceX satellite development facility in Seattle, Washington, with the intent of taking SpaceX itself into the business of internet provision and internet backhaul services, initially announced as aiming to build an approximately 4000-satellite constellation, with the first generation becoming operational in approximately 2020.

The satellites for the OneWeb constellation were initially announced to be in the  class, about the same size as the two Earth-imaging satellites that were then operated by Skybox Imaging, which Google acquired in August 2014. However, by the following year, sources put the satellites nearer  in mass.

Pre-launch agreements and investments 
In 2015, OneWeb secured US$500 million in funding, and agreed to purchase certain future launch services, from existing aerospace industry companies Arianespace and Virgin Galactic. In June 2015, OneWeb also entered into a deal with Airbus Defence and Space for the construction of its broadband Internet satellites after a competition among American and European manufacturers.

In July 2016, one year after the initial announcement, OneWeb stated they were on schedule. In December 2016, OneWeb raised US$1 billion from SoftBank Group Corp. and US$200 million from existing investors.

In February 2017, OneWeb announced that it expected to sell all of its capacity by launch time. At the time, it had formally announced capacity sold for a joint Gogo and Intelsat venture. OneWeb's founder and then executive chairman Greg Wyler announced he was considering nearly quadrupling the size of the satellite constellation by adding 1972 additional satellites that OneWeb had priority rights to. With the original capital raise of US$500 million in 2015, plus the US$1 billion investment of SoftBank in 2016, previous "investors committed to an additional US$200 million, bringing OneWeb's total capital raised to US$1.7 billion". A merger arrangement with Intelsat that had been in negotiations during May 2017 collapsed in June 2017 and did not go forward.

Manufacturing and constellation rollout 

The constellation was originally announced in June 2014 to be just half of the total of approximately 720 satellites. By early 2015, OneWeb indicated that the first launches would occur no earlier than 2017.

In February 2016, OneWeb announced that they would set up an assembly and test facility in Florida with plans to assemble and launch the majority of the satellites by the end of 2019, while manufacturing an additional 250 of the 140 kg-satellites as spares to be used in later years.

In 2019, OneWeb had formed a joint venture, OneWeb Satellites, with the European company Airbus Defence and Space in order to manufacture its satellites in higher volume and at lower cost than any satellites previously built by Airbus. A manufacturing facility was built in Merritt Island, Florida. Initial satellite production at the new facility began in mid-2019 and by January 2020, the factory reached the target production rate of two satellites per day.

By the time the actual orbital deployment of the constellation began, in February 2019, the planned constellation size had settled once again at 648, near the original projection, with 600 active satellites with 48 on-orbit spares.

In January 2020, OneWeb reached a production rate of two satellites per day. In February 2020, the company launched its first large batch of satellites.

In January 2021, OneWeb amended its application with the Federal Communications Commission (FCC) to change the number of satellites planned for its Phase Two constellation to 6,372.

First launches and additional investments 
On 27 February 2019, OneWeb launched its first six satellites into 1,200 km  low Earth orbit from the Centre Spatial Guyanais in French Guiana using a Soyuz-2 launch vehicle. The same day OneWeb announced that it had signed its first two client agreements marking the beginning of its commercialization. On 18 March 2019, OneWeb announced it had secured US$1.25 billion in funding following a successful first launch. The funding was from existing investors SoftBank and Qualcomm, as well as Grupo Salinas and the Government of Rwanda.

By August 2019, the company had six of its satellites broadcasting at the right frequencies for 90 days, meeting the "use-it-or-lose-it" spectrum conditions set by the United Nations' International Telecommunication Union (ITU). This secured the vital rights OneWeb needed to operate its global satellite broadband network.

In February and March 2020, the company launched an additional 68 satellites to orbit, stating that launches would be paused to allow a minor design modification to be made before planning to resume in May 2020.

Bankruptcy 
On 27 March 2020, OneWeb Global Limited and 18 affiliates filed for bankruptcy in the United States Bankruptcy Court for the Southern District of New York. The company said the decision was made because of the financial impact of the COVID-19 pandemic. The company laid off approximately 85% of its approximately 500 employees, but retained the capability to control its operational satellites during the period of court protection.

On 3 July 2020, a consortium led by Bharti Global and the Government of the United Kingdom won the auction to purchase the bankrupt company. The sale closed in November, allowing the company to exit Chapter 11 bankruptcy.

Exit from bankruptcy protection 
On 3 July 2020, the Government of the United Kingdom and Sunil Mittal's Bharti Global (formerly a partner of OneWeb) announced a joint plan to invest US$500 million each for equal stakes in OneWeb Global, approximately 42% each; the rest would be held by other creditors including Softbank. The UK government would also hold a golden share to give it control over any future sales. The plan was approved by the United States Bankruptcy Court for the Southern District of New York on 10 July 2020, and the deal closed in November 2020, allowing OneWeb to exit Chapter 11 bankruptcy.

In July 2020, Hughes Network Systems invested US$50 million in the consortium. The same month, the UK government stated an intention to repurpose the OneWeb satellites for its own Global Navigation Satellite System.

Shortly after the July public announcement of the OneWeb sale, a letter from Sam Beckett, the leading civil servant in the UK Department for Business, Energy and Industrial Strategy (BEIS), was released. In the letter, Beckett raised concerns that taxpayers' money could be at risk. The comments were made as part of a request for "ministerial direction", therefore it was required that the letter be made public and any concerns raised be formally overruled. BEIS minister Alok Sharma overrode the concerns and proceeded with the bid.

On 21 September 2020, OneWeb announced that their contract with Arianespace would allow them to resume satellite launch in December 2020.

New CEO, launches accelerating 
In November 2020, the company announced that Neil Masterson, formerly chief operating officer at media company Thomson Reuters, had been appointed CEO. The company launched 36 additional satellites on 17 December 2020. Furthermore, OneWeb announced plans to accelerate launches in 2021 so that the 650 satellites necessary for global coverage would be in orbit by 2022.

2021 
In January 2021, a further funding round raised $400 million from SoftBank and Hughes Network Systems, with SoftBank getting a director seat on OneWeb's board. This brought available funding to $1.4 billion, which "positions the company" to fund its first-generation fleet of 648 satellites, but would be insufficient to fund full deployment of the constellation by mid-2022. OneWeb chairman, Sunil Mittal, estimated about a further $1 billion is required, but did not anticipate difficulty in raising that.

In April 2021, OneWeb launched its sixth batch of satellites to orbit. It comprised 36 units, bringing the total in-orbit constellation to 182. In the same month, it was also reported that Eutelsat was putting £400M into the company, in return for a 24% equity stake. Eutelsat's stake decreased to 19.3% when Bharti Global increased its holding in June 2021.

In May 2021, OneWeb announced plans to buy TrustComm, a U.S.-based managed satellite communications provider. After the purchase, the company became OneWeb's government distribution partner.

In May 2021, OneWeb's seventh launch took the number of satellites in orbit to 218, to create the second largest fleet behind Starlink.
By comparison Starlink had 1,700 satellites by the end of 2021.

In June 2021, Oneweb raised an additional US$500M from Bharti Global, increasing Bharti's holding to 38.6%. In August 2021, Hanwha Systems invested $300 million to purchase an 8.8% share in OneWeb, enabling Hanwha to appoint one member of the board of directors and bring its own dual-use defense and satellite technology to the company.

OneWeb became the founding member of Indian Space Association (ISpA). ISpA will act as bridge between Indian Space Research Organisation (ISRO) and private industries to form the space ecosystem in India.

2022 Russia controversy 
In March 2022, media reported that OneWeb was scheduled to launch a batch of 36 satellites from Russia despite the UK's sanctions against that country due to Russia's invasion of Ukraine. There were calls for the UK to cancel the launch.  Russia said the launch had already been paid for and would not be refunded, and would be cancelled from the Russian side unless OneWeb provided additional assurance that the satellites would never be used for military purposes and the British Government disposed of its shares in the company. The British government refused this demand and the launch was cancelled, along with other Russian launches. OneWeb, tried much through negotiations to get back the stack of 36 oneweb satellites stranded in Kazakhstan due to political reasons. However, these negotiations never progressed and as oneweb was on the verge of completing 1st generation oneweb satellite network, they have given up hope on March 2023, on further attempting to  get back the satellites valued at $50 million, potentially scrapping that batch of oneweb satellites. Also, these satellites were insured and they received the insurance money for them.

SpaceX/NSIL launch services 
On 21 March 2022, OneWeb announced that it had signed a launch agreement with United States launch provider SpaceX to launch the remaining satellites on Falcon 9 rockets, with the first launch expected no earlier than summer 2022. On 20 April 2022 OneWeb announced a similar deal with NewSpace India Limited, the commercial arm of the Indian Space Research Organisation, OneWeb satellites were deployed by LVM 3 on 22 October 2022, using a lightly modified version of the satellite dispenser previously used on Soyuz.

SpaceX was originally contracted to launch three missions for OneWeb. However, an additional flight was contracted on 11 January 2023 for summer 2023 to add backup satellites in orbit. Three flights have been completed so far, the first flight was back on 8 December 2022, and the second was on 10 January 2023.  As of early March 2023, there are 584 OneWeb satellites in orbit (two of which are unoperational), with SpaceX having successfully launched its third flight for OneWeb on March 9, 2023, with a load of 40 satellites.

Merger with Eutelsat 

The merger of OneWeb and France's Eutelsat – an operator of geostationary satellites – was announced in July 2022. OneWeb shareholders would receive 50% of the enlarged share capital while the British government would retain its golden share or "special share" in OneWeb itself, in a transaction which valued OneWeb at $3.4 billion USD (£2.8 billion). The French and British governments are expected to have similar direct stakes of roughly 10% in the new joint entity as well as a seat on the board each.

The board of directors structure, when the deal is finalized in second or third quarter 2023, will have Eutelsat chair Dominique D’Hinnin and CEO Eva Berneke continue in their same roles for the combined company. Sunil Bharti Mitta, representing OneWeb, will be the co-chair.  Bpifrance, Fonds Stratégique de Participations, Hanwha Group, and the British government are set to appoint one director each to the combined group's board. While OneWeb can appoint three more independent directors and Eutelsat can select four.

Intended markets
In March 2021, OneWeb stated its market would be primarily to businesses, governments including defence, phone network operators and clusters of communities, rather than to individual domestic customers which Starlink primarily targets. Users willing to connect were advised to contact their local telecom operator.

OneWeb satellite constellation 
Initially, the OneWeb satellite constellation is planned to have 648 satellites in low Earth orbit (LEO) that can provide high-speed broadband internet to rural and isolated areas. As of January 2023, thay have launched 544 satellites, with 542 being functional. The constellation is planned for completion by the end of March 2023. OneWeb engineers will then take a few months to test the system before commercial service commences in the fourth quarter of 2023.

The small satellites were built by OneWeb Satellites, a joint venture between Airbus and OneWeb. The satellites are in a circular orbit, at approximately  altitude, and transmitting and receiving in the Ku-band radio frequency.

OneWeb's first six satellites were launched on a Soyuz rocket on 27 February 2019. The first large batch of 34 satellites was launched on 6 February 2020, and another 34 were put into orbit on 21 March 2020. These were followed by more launches in 2021. The Russian invasion of Ukraine in February 2022 meant that launches on the Soyuz rocket were suspended, and Arianespace had to find other launch providers for OneWeb. Satellite launches resumed in quarter four of 2022 using the SpaceX Falcon 9 and the Indian LVM3 rockets.

Design 
The 648 operational satellites are to operate in 12 near polar orbit planes at  altitude, at 86.4° orbital inclination. Initially 18 orbital planes with 49 satellites per plane was planned, requiring 882 satellites plus some spares, but improved satellite coverage capability allowed this to be reduced to 12 planes of 49 satellites requiring 588 satellites plus some on-orbit spares.
 
The first-generation satellites do not have inter-satellite data links, so can only provide a user service when also in the range of a gateway ground station. As of 2023, OneWeb expect the final operational constellation to be fewer than 1,000 satellites, instead of several thousands being considered earlier. A number of next generation satellites of about  mass may be procured in the future.
 
The satellites provide user service in the Ku-band. Links to the gateway ground stations are in the Ka-band. The satellites are designed to comply with "orbital debris-mitigation guidelines for removing satellites from orbit and, for low-orbit satellites, assuring that they re-enter the Earth's atmosphere within 25 years of retirement".

Launches 

On 27 February 2019, OneWeb successfully launched the first six of the 648 planned 1st generation satellites (600 active plus 48 on-orbit spares) into low Earth orbit from the Centre Spatial Guyanais using a Russian Soyuz ST-B rocket.

List of launches 
In November 2019, OneWeb planned monthly launches to begin in January 2020, although the first of these launches was delayed to early February 2020, and bankruptcy and subsequent reorganization delayed the fourth launch to 18 December 2020. Since the fourth launch, OneWeb has launched five times from Vostochny; once from Kourou; thrice from Baikonur; once from Sriharikota and three times from Cape Canaveral, with the recent one being on 9 March 2023. Due to these launches, OneWeb takes its in-orbit mega-constellation to 582 operational satellites (2 satellites failed) that account for 89.81% operating out of 648 planned satellites and making OneWeb the second largest satellite fleet in orbit.

Generation 1 satellites

Total number of operational satellites: 582 as of 10 March 2023.

Generation 2 satellites

Active internet services 
In May 2021, OneWeb said that its then current constellation (218 spacecraft), as well as an additional 36 satellites planned to launch on 1 July 2021, would be equipped to service northern regions, including the United Kingdom, Alaska, Northern Europe, Greenland, Iceland, the Arctic Seas, and Canada, by the end of the year.

The company's 648-satellite network was planned for completion by late 2022, with OneWeb making global internet services available at that time. Owing to launch delays from Roscosmos (see below) the constellation is now expected to be completed in early 2023 following three launches early that year.

Concerns

End-of-life concerns 
With such a large number of satellites being added to the already crowded low Earth orbit, plans for handling the satellites once the operational life of each satellite is completed are an important consideration. Concerns about adding to the existing space debris problem have been expressed.

With OneWeb satellites having higher orbits than the competing Starlink megaconstallation satellites (which will deorbit in ~5 years without action due to atmospheric drag), OneWeb satellites will not passively deorbit in a reasonable timeframe. As such, each OneWeb satellite has fuel allocated to be able to actively deorbit at its end of life. OneWeb satellites are also equipped with an Altius DogTag magnetic grappling fixture, to make it possible for another spacecraft to attach and change the orbit of satellites whose built-in deorbit functionality fails, though there does not currently exist commercial services to carry out this active debris removal service. The risk of a OneWeb satellite becoming a source of debris was determined to be <0.01, which meets NASA's Technical Standard.

Interference with other Earth-bound transceivers 
OneWeb competitor, satellite fleet operator ABS, has expressed concerns about the amount of electromagnetic interference that the OneWeb constellation could add to existing terrestrial transceivers.

Russian security concerns 
Vladimir Sadovnikov of the Federal Security Service (FSB) stated in 2018 that the FSB was opposed to OneWeb covering Russia, saying that OneWeb could be used for espionage purposes. OneWeb's request for a frequency band was previously rejected by the Ministry for Digital Development and Communications, purportedly due to outstanding legal issues. FSB also proposed increasing scrutiny on other satellite Internet equipment in Russia.

Competition 
As of January 2023, the major competitor is SpaceX's Starlink satellite network with over 1 million customers. While OneWeb will only work with partner telephone companies, SpaceX is also serving consumers directly.

Competition to OneWeb for producing smaller and lower-cost satellites, in general, is thought to come "from other makers of small satellites, thought to include companies such as Nevada-based Sierra Nevada Corp. and Britain's Surrey Satellite Technology Ltd." as of 2014.

Amazon announced a large broadband internet satellite constellation proposal in April 2019, planning to launch up to 3,236 satellites in the next decade in what Amazon calls "Project Kuiper", a satellite constellation that will work in concert
with Amazon's previously announced large network of 12 satellite ground station facilities (the "AWS Ground Station unit") announced in November 2018.

Historically, earlier companies that have attempted to build satellite internet service networks and provide space-based internet connections have not fared well, as these services were hobbled by high costs which consequently attracted few users. Iridium SSC filed for bankruptcy protection in 1999, Globalstar did the same in 2002, and Teledesic suspended its satellite construction work in the same year.

See also 

 Iridium satellite constellation — 82 operational satellites used to provide global satellite phone services.
 Orbcom satellite constellation — 29 operational satellites used to provide global asset monitoring and messaging services.
 Starlink satellite constellation — a development project underway by SpaceX to deploy nearly 12,000 satellites in three orbital shells by the mid-2020s.
 China national satellite internet project
 Lynk Global — a satellite-to-mobile-phone satellite constellation with the objective of coverage to traditional low-cost mobile devices
 Teledesic — a former (1990s) venture to accomplish broadband satellite internet services
 Viasat, Inc. — a current broadband satellite provider providing fixed, ground mobile, and airborne antennas

References

External links 
 

Satellite Internet access
Communications satellite operators
Aerospace companies
Satellite telephony
British companies established in 2012
British brands
Companies based in London
American companies established in 2012
Companies based in Arlington County, Virginia
Companies that filed for Chapter 11 bankruptcy in 2020
Softbank portfolio companies
Bharti Enterprises